Stefan Müller (born September 20, 1979) is a Swiss javelin thrower. Müller is the Swiss national record holder with 82.07 metres, achieved in September 2006 in Bern.

He finished seventh in the javelin final at the 2006 European Athletics Championships in Gothenburg, throwing a personal best. He won a bronze medal at the 2005 Summer Universiade.

Competition record

Seasonal bests by year
2002 - 75.73
2003 - 77.95
2004 - 76.65
2005 - 78.98
2006 - 82.07
2007 - 79.43
2008 - 77.32
2009 - 81.07
2011 - 76.94

References

1979 births
Living people
Swiss male javelin throwers
Universiade medalists in athletics (track and field)
Universiade bronze medalists for Switzerland
Competitors at the 2003 Summer Universiade
Medalists at the 2005 Summer Universiade